Buenos Aires is a town and municipality in the Cauca Department, Colombia. Founded in by Vasco de Guzmán and Alonso de Fuenmayor in 1551, the municipality covers an area  and has a population of 21,300. The population is primarily engaged in agriculture and ranching.

References

Municipalities of Cauca Department
1551 establishments in the Spanish Empire